Neodermaptera, sometimes called Catadermaptera, is a suborder of earwigs in the order Dermaptera. There are more than 2,000 described species in Neodermaptera.

The former suborders Forficulina, Hemimerina, and Arixeniina have been reduced in rank to family and placed into the new suborder Neodermaptera. Neodermaptera now contains all the extant species of Dermaptera, while the extinct species make up the suborders Archidermaptera and Eodermaptera.

Families
BioLib includes seven superfamilies, with the Dermaptera Species File grouping these into two infraorders and fossil genera incertae sedis:

Epidermaptera
Infraorder authority: Engel, 2003

Anisolabidoidea
Authority: Verhoeff, 1902
 Anisolabididae Verhoeff, 1902

Apachyoidea
Authority: Verhoeff, 1902
 Apachyidae Verhoeff, 1902

Forficuloidea
Authority: Latreille, 1810 (synonym Forficulina)

 Arixeniidae Jordan, 1909
 Chelisochidae Verhoeff, 1902
 Forficulidae Latreille, 1810
 Spongiphoridae Verhoeff, 1902 - little earwigs: includes Labiinae

Hemimeroidea
Authority: Sharp, 1895 
 Hemimeridae Sharp, 1895

Labiduroidea
Authority: Verhoeff, 1902 
 Labiduridae Verhoeff, 1902 - striped earwigs

Protodermaptera
Infraorder authority: Zacher, 1910

Karschielloidea
Authority: Verhoeff, 1902 
 Karschiellidae Verhoeff, 1902

Pygidicranoidea
Authority: Verhoeff, 1902 
 Diplatyidae Verhoeff, 1902
 Haplodiplatyidae Engel, 2016: monotypic contains genus Haplodiplatys Hincks, 1955 from Asia
 Pygidicranidae Verhoeff, 1902

Fossil genera
 †Autrigonoforceps Engel and Peris, 2015
 †Laasbium Scudder, 1900
 †Litholabis Engel & Chatzimanolis, 2010
 †Ocellia Olfers, 1907
 †Petrolabis Engel & Chatzimanolis, 2010
 †Rhadinolabis Engel, Ortega-Blanco & Azar, 2011
 †Rupiforficula Engel & Chatzimanolis, 2010
 †Vendeenympha Engel & Perrichot, 2014

References

Further reading

External links

Earwigs
Taxa named by Michael S. Engel